Wojciech Jastrzębowski (25 February 1884 – 9 March 1963) was a Polish sculptor. His work was part of the sculpture event in the art competition at the 1932 Summer Olympics.

References

External links
 

1884 births
1963 deaths
20th-century Polish sculptors
Polish male sculptors
20th-century male artists
Olympic competitors in art competitions
Artists from Warsaw